Zephyrantheae Salisb. is a now obsolete tribe within the American clade of family Amaryllidaceae (subfamily Amaryllidoideae), containing five genera (Habranthus, Pyrolirion, Rhodophiala, Sprekelia, Zephyranthes).

Description 
corona absent, stem leafless, ovules many, perianth tube present, flowers solitary or paired.

Taxonomy 
Richard Anthony Salisbury in his original description in 1866, defined the Zephyrantheae as an 'Order' with two sections and a number of subgroups, such as Omphalissa.

The composition has varied, given the considerable rearrangements of the Amaryllidaceae that have taken place. For instance Hickey and Clive (1997) describe the Zephyrantheae as being one of ten tribes by which the Amaryllidaceae are divided, allocating Zephyranthes and Sternbergia to this tribe, while Traub (1952) included Habranthus. Other genera that have been placed in this tribe include Cooperia, Haylockia, Apodolirion, and Gethyllis.

In his 1963 monograph on Amaryllidaceae, Traub lists six species, Rhodophiala, Haylockia, Pyrolirion, Zephyranthes, Habranthus and Sprekelia. Meerow et al. (1999) provides an account (Table 1) of the subsequent rearrangement of Traub's genera, and of the modern molecular based phylogeny (see also Taxonomy of Amaryllidoideae).

References

Bibliography

Walter Samuel Flory
Florey Papers
 Chromosome Diversity in Species, and in Hybrids, of the Tribe Zephyrantheae. The Nucleus,  (1968)
 Chromosome Diversity and Variation in Species, and in Hybrids, of the Tribe Zephyrantheae. Abstract, (1968.)
 Chromosomes of Interspecific and Intergeneric Hybrids in Zephyrantheae. Abstract, (1968.)
 High Chromosome Numbers in Several Zephyrantheae Texa. Plant Life, Vol. 36, (1980)
 New Chromosomes in Hybrids in Tribe Zephyrantheae. Abstract, (1969)
 The Origins of Three Recently Described Taxa in Tribe Zephyrantheae. Abstract, (1964.)
 Parthenogenesis in Zephyrantheae. Herbertia, Vol. 6, (1939.)

Amaryllidoideae
Historically recognized angiosperm taxa